Ikshana (Sanskrit: īkṣaṇa) is a noun which means sight, care and superintendence but also refers to eye, sight, look, seeing, viewing, aspect, caring for, looking after, regarding.

In the Mahabharata, Brahma is said to have become the Ikshana (eye), in the form of this mobile and immobile universe, of all entities that took birth; in the phrase Vrishbhekshana, Virishbha implies the Vedas and ikshana, the eye. Kalidasa, in the phrase मदिरेक्षणे appearing in passage II.72 of his Abhigyanashakuntalam, has also used the word Ikshana to mean the eye, which phrase Sankara explains is – madira ('wine') as applied to the eye (ikshana), - eye as equivalent to 'beautiful', madirekhshane means the one whose eyes intoxicate like wine or is the wine-eyed.

Ikshana is a technical term used in Vedanta to show how creation took place by the beholding of Para-brahman as an intelligent and a personal act of the creator; it means revelation of the created. Parabrahman is essentially citta who produces his self as Shabda Brahman (Logos) by ikshana ('beholding').

Badarayana states:-

इक्षतिकर्मव्यपदेशात् सः| (Brahma Sutra) I.iii.13

"From the mention as the object of the act of seeing, it follows that the supreme Self is meant."

Adi Shankara, in his commentary on this sutra, states that the object of ikshana ('seeing') is the supreme Self, Brahman, and not Hiranyagarbha, the inferior Brahman. He says that the term ikshati-karma means the object covered by the act of seeing. The all-pervading entity (Purusa) that is to be seen can be seen to be "higher than the high one" meditated.  Pippalada tells Satyakama, son of Sibi, that he by the Sama hymns is elevated to the Brahmaloka, he from this jivanghata ('the Macrocosmic Soul') beholds the supreme Being – एतस्माज्जीवघ्नात्परात्परं पुरिशयं पुरुषुमीक्षति - Prashna Upanishad V.5.

The statement – uho nama vi-tarkoktih pra-vicharekshanatmakah, the terms Vitarka and Tarka are used interchangeably, tarka occurs after speech, mind and prana have been restrained immediately before Samadhi, vitarka consists of advanced thought and observation (ikshana); it is through discernment (uha) that one leaves the lower plane of savikalpa and gets uplifted.

The Vedic concept of tapas and the Upanishadic concept of ikshana to the effect that consciousness and force are ultimately the same and every will has an aspect of force, helped Sri Aurobindo to conclude that the fact is only a partial reflection of the Idea which has created it and that it is the idea which expresses itself in matter and takes to itself bodies, and formulate the 'Theory of ideas as forces'.

It was through ekacittekshana-samyukta-prajna the supreme perfect knowledge was realized (abhisambodha) by Gautama Buddha, that converted Boddhisattva to Buddha; ekacittekshana refers to Prajna exercised in unison with 'one-thought-viewing' when there is no separation between 'knower' and the 'known', all are viewed in one thought and enlightenment is the outcome.

References

Hindu philosophical concepts
Sanskrit words and phrases
Vedanta
Yoga concepts